Kolur (also Romanized as Kolūr) is a village in Kalashi Rural District, Kalashi District, Javanrud County, Kermanshah Province, Iran. At the 2006 census, its population was 106, in 21 families.

References 

Populated places in Javanrud County